Major General Tomas Nopoudjuu Hamunyela is a retired Namibian military officer. His last command was as the Commander of the Namibian Army.

Career
His military career started in 1977 when he joined the People's Liberation Army of Namibia in exile. He rose through PLAN to hold different appointments. He PLAN Deputy Chief of Operations, he also served as Chief of Operation Northern Front, Detachment Commander Eastern front in Zambia, Engineer Detachment Deputy Commander Eastern Front and as Engineer Detachment Eastern Front in Zambia.

In 1990 he was a pioneer of the NDF officer corps as he was inducted. He served in various capacities and ranks within the military. He rose to the rank of Colonel and appointed as Chief of Army Operations, Training, Intelligence and Communications. He was deployed to DRC during the Second Congo War he served as Southern African Development Community allied forces Chief of Staff. He got promoted to Brigadier General and appointed as General Officer Commanding 26 Motorised Infantry Brigade. Later he was transferred to Army HQ and appointed as deputy Army Commander with the same rank.  He was then appointed as Defence Attache to Zimbabwe. He was then promoted to Major General and appointed as Army Commander on 30 December 2014.

Honours and decorations
  NDF Commendation Medal
  Campaign Medal

References

1957 births
Living people
Namibian military personnel
People's Liberation Army of Namibia personnel